Gavin Baddeley (born 28 December 1966) is an ordained Reverend in the Church of Satan, and an experienced journalist who has worked for The Observer and Metal Hammer. He is the occult authority for the BBC and Channel 4, has addressed Cambridge University, and has been profiled in The Independent and The London Evening Standard. He made an appearance in the documentary film Metal: A Headbanger's Journey.

Baddeley was ordained into the Church of Satan by Anton LaVey, and subsequently set up the London branch of the church.

Bibliography
 Raising Hell!: The Book of Satan and Rock 'n' Roll (Nemesis, 1993)
 Lucifer Rising: A Book of Sin, Devil Worship and Rock n’ Roll (Plexus, 1999)
 Dissecting Marilyn Manson (Plexus, 2000)
 Goth Chic: A Connoisseur's Guide To Dark Culture (Plexus, 2002)
 God's Assassins - The Medieval Roots of Terrorism [with Paul Woods] (Ian Allan, 2009)
 Saucy Jack - The Elusive Ripper [with Paul Woods] (Ian Allan, 2009)
 The Gospel of Filth (FAB Press, 2009-2010)
 Vampire Lovers: Screen's Seductive Creatures of the Night (Plexus, 2010)
 FrightFest Guide to Werewolf Movies (FAB Press, 2019)

References

British Satanists
1966 births
British male journalists
Living people
English Luciferians